Cathepsin L2, (also known as cathepsin V or cathepsin U), is a protein encoded in humans by the CTSV gene. 

The protein is a human cysteine cathepsin, a lysosomal cysteine protease with endopeptidase activity.

The protein is a member of the papain-like protease family (MEROPS family C1), a lysosomal cysteine protease with endopeptidase activity. It may play an important role in corneal physiology. This gene is expressed in colorectal and breast carcinomas but not in normal colon, mammary gland, or peritumoral tissues, suggesting a possible role for this gene in tumor processes.

Clinical significance
Cathepsin L2 may play a role in the pathogenesis of keratoconus.

References

External links
 The MEROPS online database for peptidases and their inhibitors: C01.009

Further reading

Proteases
EC 3.4.22